Lakshmana Rekha is a 1984 Indian Malayalam-language drama film directed by I. V. Sasi, written by P. V. Kuriakkose, and produced by M. P. Ramachandran. The film stars Mohanlal, Mammootty, and Seema in lead roles. The film is a melodrama exploiting the Kerala convention of marriage between cousins. The film features songs composed by A. T. Ummer and background score by Shyam.

Plot 
Retired colonel Rajasekharan has two sons—Sukumaran and Sudhakaran and a daughter, Sunitha. Sukumaran, a police officer, is married to their cousin Radha. In the initial days, they abstain from having sexual intercourse as Radha is going through her menstruation period. In the fifth day of their marriage, when they had decided to participate in their first sexual intercourse, Sukumaran meets an accident and is paralyzed for life. Radha now looks after a bedridden Sukumaran.

While Radha and Sukumaran's life ended in misery, Sudhakaran's life is going well. He is appointed as the new General Manager of a corporate company. Sudhakaran sympathizes with Radha. Meanwhile, Radha suffers from frequent headaches. Their family doctor conducts several diagnosis on her, but reveals nothing. For a second opinion, Sudhakaran and Radha goes to a hospital to consult a neurologist, again the diagnosis shows nothing. The doctor theorizes that such headaches can also cause due to sexual frustration and it could likely be the case here considering her situation.

That night, Sudhakaran and Radha are sharing a double room in a hotel as two rooms were unavailable. While Radha was sleeping, Sudhakaran forces himself on her sexually, at first she resists but then she is submissive. They both perform intercourse. The next morning, Sudhakaran reveals her that he sexually approached her because of what the doctor said as Sukumaran is helpless. It shows result, Radha is relieved from her frequent headaches in the coming days.

Eventually, Radha gets pregnant, the family is shocked. Sudhakaran reveals it is his child but still hides what the doctor said. Rajasekharan contemns his son. Sudhakaran is willing to marry her. Finally, the family decides to get her married to Sudhakaran without informing Sukumaran. But Radha tells him everything. Unable to handle this new development, he losses his ability to speak. That night Sukumaran is killed by overdose of sleeping pills. Sudhakaran and Sunitha suspects Radha, while Radha suspects Sudhakaran. Breaking the suspense, Rajasekharan reveals that he killed his tormented son to end his misery. He calls the police and gets himself arrested.

Cast 
Mohanlal as Sudhakaran
Mammootty as Sukumaran
Seema as Radha
K. P. Ummer as Colonel Rajasekharan
Kalaranjini as Sunitha
 P. K. Abraham as Dr. Mathews
 Adoor Bhasi as Radha's father
 Kaviyoor Ponnamma as Radha's mother
 Janardhanan as Balachandra Menon
 Sumithra as Vilasini

Soundtrack 
The music was composed by A. T. Ummer and the lyrics were written by Bichu Thirumala.

References

External links 
 
 Movie on YouTube

1984 films
1980s Malayalam-language films
Indian drama films
Films directed by I. V. Sasi
Films scored by A. T. Ummer